Robert Galloway and Alex Lawson were the defending champions but chose not to defend their title.

Nicolás Álvarez Varona and Iñaki Montes de la Torre won the title after defeating Benjamin and Courtney John Lock 7–6(7–3), 6–3 in the final.

Seeds

Draw

References

External links
 Main draw

Open Castilla y León - Doubles
2022 Doubles